Michael Phillips Marcus is a commodities trader who, in less than 20 years, is reputed to have turned his initial $30,000 into $80 million.

Career
Marcus began his trading career in 1972 when he bought plywood futures with his life savings of $7000. In the summer of 1972 President Richard Nixon froze prices of some commodities, but the futures contracts rallied sharply, increasing Marcus' stake from $7000 into $12,000. In 1973 he turned $24,000 into $64,000. He also used Freight derivatives.

Marcus learned money management laws from Ed Seykota, whom he met while working as an analyst.
Marcus eventually became an EVP at Commodities Corporation. Marcus has recently invested in small-company stock through his holding company Canmarc Trading Co and later made private-placement investments in small OTC Bulletin Board listed companies like Prospector Consolidated Resources
and Encore Clean Energy Inc
and Pink Sheets Touchstone Resources.

ViRexx Medical Corp, a company focused on immunotherapy treatments for certain cancers, chronic hepatitis B and C, and embolotherapy treatments for tumors, announced Marcus's election to its Board of Directors at its Annual General Meeting held May 25, 2006.

Marcus was featured by Thomas A Bass, in the book The Predictors: How a Band of Maverick Physicists Used Chaos Theory to Trade Their Way to a Fortune on Wall Street.  Additionally, Marcus was interviewed by Jack Schwager in the book Market Wizards.  Marcus was described as a chartist who "keeps an eye on market penetration and resistance."

Education and personal
Raised in Providence, Rhode Island, he graduated in 1969 Phi Beta Kappa from Johns Hopkins and studied Psychology at Clark University. At one time he was a devout follower of the Maharishi Mahesh Yogi.

Notes

References

Books

Further reading

1947 births
Living people
People from Providence, Rhode Island
Johns Hopkins University alumni
Clark University alumni
American financial businesspeople
American money managers
Stock and commodity market managers
American philanthropists
American stock traders
American currency traders
American commodities traders